The 2012 Geelong Football Club season was the club's 113th season of senior competition in the Australian Football League (AFL). The club also fielded its reserves team in the Victorian Football League (VFL) for the 13th season.

Club personnel

Following the retirement of incumbent premiership captain Cameron Ling in the off-season, Joel Selwood was appointed the club's new captain in January 2012, with Jimmy Bartel assuming the role of vice-captain. Additionally, Joel Corey, Corey Enright, James Kelly and Harry Taylor remain in the player leadership group from the prior season, with Steve Johnson the sole promotion to the group. Selwood's older brother, Troy, captained the club's VFL team for the second successive season; however due to the departure of Matt Firman, his co-captain from the prior season, it was his first time as sole captain.

The departure of assistant coach Brenton Sanderson to the vacant Adelaide senior coach position in September 2011 resulted in a number of coaching changes for the club, the first being the promotion of the club's VFL coach, Dale Amos, as Sanderson's replacement. Subsequently, Amos was replaced by former Essendon coach Matthew Knights, with former Geelong player Max Rooke also joining the coaching staff as a development coach, working with the younger club players. Assistant coach Matthew Egan also departed the club to take up the same position with Essendon. The remainder of the club's coaching panel remained unchanged from 2011, with Blake Caracella, Nigel Lappin and James Rahilly returning as assistant coaches and Paul Hood continuing his role as academy co-ordinator. Furthermore, Brad Ottens, a former Geelong player who retired in the off-season, also returned to the club in a new role as part-time ruck coach.

Playing list
Despite this not eventuating, Geelong still lost six players on its list due to retirement, including premiership players Cameron Ling (captain), Darren Milburn, Cameron Mooney, Brad Ottens and Mark Blake, as well as Marcus Drum, who did not play a senior game for the club. Additionally, Geelong delisted two rookie-listed players: Ben Johnson and Jack Weston.

Geelong's participation in the trade week was minimal, with no incoming or outgoing trades finalised. It did however secure Jed Bews, son of former player Andrew, under the Father-Son Rule. In addition to using its last pick (86) on Bews, a further five players were drafted by the club in the 2011 National Draft: Joel Hamling (pick 32), Shane Kersten (34), Jordan Murdoch (48), Lincoln McCarthy (66) and Orren Stephenson (78). With the club choosing not to promote any rookies, it subsequently drafted Cameron Eardley (pick 18) and Jackson Sheringham (36) in the 2012 Rookie Draft, as well as a steeplechase runner, Mark Blicavs (54). Geelong did not participate in the corresponding Pre-season Draft.

 Playing statistics

 Players are listed in alphabetical order by surname, and statistics are for AFL regular season and finals series matches during the 2012 AFL season only.

Season summary

Pre-season matches

Regular season

Ladder

Finals series

Teams

Awards and records

 Milestones
 Round 1 – Billie Smedts (AFL debut), Orren Stephenson (AFL debut)
 Round 3 – George Horlin-Smith (AFL debut)
 Round 4 – Jesse Stringer (AFL debut)
 Round 8 – James Kelly (200 games), James Podsiadly (50 games)
 Round 9 – Jonathan Simpkin (AFL debut)
 Round 10 – Harry Taylor (100 games), Lincoln McCarthy (AFL debut), Jordan Schroder (AFL debut)
 Round 11 – David Wojcinski (200 games)
 Round 14 – Jordan Murdoch (AFL debut)
 Round 16 – Jackson Sheringham (AFL debut), Josh Walker (AFL debut)
 Round 18 – Joel Corey (250 games)
 Round 23 – Tom Hawkins (100 games), Mitch Duncan (50 games)

 AFL awards
 Member of the 2012 All-Australian team (full-forward) – Tom Hawkins
 AFLPA Robert Rose Award for Most Courageous Player – Joel Selwood (tied with West Coast's Beau Waters)

 Other
 Tom Hawkins – 2012 AFL Mark of the Year (Round 2 nomination)
 Steven Motlop – 2012 AFL Goal of the Year (Round 3 nomination)
 James Podsiadly – 2012 AFL Mark of the Year (Round 3 nomination)
 Steven Motlop – 2012 AFL Rising Star (Round 6 nomination)
 Matthew Scarlett – 2012 AFL Mark of the Year (Round 13 nomination)
 Tom Hawkins – 2012 AFL Mark of the Year (Round 15 nomination)

Match Review Panel and Tribunal cases

 Pre-season competition – Week 1
 Josh Hunt was charged with a level two engaging in rough conduct offence against Luke Parker. By entering an early plea, Hunt consequentially accepted a two-match suspension and 43.52 points towards his future record; the severity of the sanction a result of his existing bad judiciary record.

 Pre-season competition – Week 4
 Joel Selwood was fined $900 for his involvement in wrestling with Liam Picken, in which he accepted with an early plea.

 Round 1
 James Kelly received a reprimand and 93.75 demerit points as a result of a level two striking charge against Tendai Mzungu, in which he pleaded guilty.
 Matthew Scarlett also accepted a sanction for a striking offence, in this case a level four charge against Hayden Ballantyne. His poor judiciary record resulted in a three-match suspension with an additional 33.52 carry-over points towards his future record.

 Round 4
 Steve Johnson was charged with two separate incidents in the one match, the first being a level-one rough conduct offence against Chris Newman, as well as a level-one tripping offence against Daniel Jackson (both of ). Johnson accepted a reprimand and 78 points towards his future record for the tripping offence, but successfully contested the rough conduct charge at the tribunal, resulting in no action taken. As the two cases would have been merged to create an overall penalty, an early plea for both offences would have resulted in a combined points accumulation of 199.88 which is a one match suspension, and leaving Johnson with 99.88 carry-over points for a period of a year.
 Trent West was charged with a level-one engaging in rough conduct offence against Ty Vickery; by entering an early plea, West accepted a reprimand and 70.31 points towards his future record.

 Round 7
 Joel Corey was charged with "making an obscene gesture" and subsequently accepted a $900 fine with an early plea.

 Round 11
 Josh Hunt accepted a $1,350 fine for a misconduct offence in which he stood on opponent Eddie Betts

 Round 15
 Jimmy Bartel was charged with a level-four striking offence against Trent McKenzie in which he received a two-match suspension and 43.75 points towards his future record following his submission of an early guilty plea.

 Round 17
 Matthew Scarlett was suspended for the second time this season following a level two striking offence against Cory Dell'Olio. To avoid a possible two-match sanction, Scarlett entered an early guilty plea accepting a one-match suspension and 65.77 points towards his future record.

 Round 20
 Joel Selwood was charged with a level-one misconduct offence against his brother Adam Selwood for making "unnecessary or unreasonable contact with an injured player". Selwood entered an early plea and consequentially accepted a reprimand and 84 points towards his future record. This was despite club coach Chris Scott publicly stating that the guilty plea "doesn't mean we agree with the decision", but rather that the club was not prepared to take the risk that Selwood would be suspended for the following round's match. Selwood also remained eligible for the 2012 Brownlow Medal by entering an early guilty plea.

 Round 23
 Paul Chapman received a reprimand and 60 points towards his future record by entering an early guilty plea for a level-one striking offence against Ben McGlynn.
 Steve Johnson was charged with engaging in rough conduct (a level one offence) against Dan Hannebery which attracted a one-match sanction and 180.38 carry-over points with an early plea. Due to his previous charge this season, rather than risking a two-match suspension by taking the case to the tribunal, Johnson and the club accepted the early plea offer.

In response to the charges on Chapman and Johnson, club football manager Neil Balme publicly criticised the Match Review Panel stating "we [the club] certainly aren't happy with it" and that despite the club's acceptance of the sanctions, they would have preferred to challenge Johnson's charge in terms of justice, but couldn't justify the risk. Balme claimed that Chapman's incident was "accidental at worst" and that Hannebery, due to a lack of awareness, had caused Johnson's offence himself.

 Elimination final
 James Kelly was charged with a level one bumping or making forceful contact from front-on offence against Tendai Mzungu and was offered a one-match sanction and 64.06 carry-over points by the Match Review Panel, which he accepted with an early plea. As a result, he will miss the opening round of the 2013 AFL season.

VFL season

Squad
The 2012 VFL squad was named on 13 March 2012 and consists of 21 players, nine of whom were retained from the prior season. Senior and rookie-listed players for Geelong's AFL team are also eligible for selection in VFL matches. Additionally, potential father-son draftee Jordon Bourke (son of Damian) was granted special permission by the AFL to play two games for Geelong's VFL team in rounds 18 and 19.

 Andrew Banjanin
 Jaxson Barham
 Dyson Bell-Warren
 Heath Brown
 Ben Capra
 Rob Condy
 Mark Corrigan

 Daniel Gibbs
 Dominic Gleeson
 Mitch Herbison
 Darcy Holden
 Jack Hollmer
 Ben Johnson
 Tommy Maas

 Andrew McLean
 Ben Raidme
 Troy Selwood
 Jack Shannahan
 Matthew Sully
 Casey Tutungi
 Tom Williams

Results

Notes
 Key

 H ^ Home match.
 A ^ Away match.

 Notes
Jonathan Simpkin was elevated to the senior list in place of the injured Nathan Vardy on 24 May, making him eligible to play in a senior AFL match. After making his debut in round nine, he was returned to the rookie list on 31 May following the reinstatement of Daniel Menzel from the long-term injury list. He was re-elevated to the senior list on 31 July 2012 when Josh Cowan was placed on the long-term injury list, and played three more senior games for the season, including in the club's elimination final against Fremantle.
Jesse Stringer was elevated to the senior list on 19 April, making him eligible to play in a senior AFL match. He subsequently played eight matches before being banned from senior football by Geelong for the remainder of the season on 20 June following an off-field indiscretion which the club described as "totally unacceptable behaviour". He was later replaced on the senior list by Nathan Vardy, who was returning from a long-term injury.
Geelong's scores are indicated in bold font.
The Adelaide-Geelong match at AAMI Stadium on 12 May was rescheduled from 1:15 pm to 12:45 pm to avoid a clash with racehorse Black Caviar's historic attempt for 21 wins from 21 starts.
"Points" refers to any carry-over points accrued following the sanction. For example, 154.69 points would result in a one-match suspension, with 54.69 carry-over points (for every 100 points, a one-match suspension is given).

References

External links
 Official website of the Geelong Football Club
 Official website of the Australian Football League

2012
Geelong Football Club